Odean Pope (born October 24, 1938) is an American jazz tenor saxophonist.

Biography

Pope was raised in Philadelphia, where he learned from Ray Bryant while young. Early in his career, at Philadelphia's Uptown Theater, Pope played behind a number of noted rhythm and blues artists including James Brown, Marvin Gaye and Stevie Wonder.

He played briefly in the 1960s with Jimmy McGriff, and late in the 1960s he began working with Max Roach, including on tours of Europe in 1967-68. He was a member of Philadelphia group Catalyst in the early and mid-1970s, and assembled the Saxophone Choir, which consists of nine saxophones and a rhythm section (piano, bass and drums), in 1977. He became a regular member of Roach's quartet in 1979 and recorded extensively with him, in addition to numerous releases as a leader.

Pope has publicly spoken about his bipolar disorder, which he has had for over 30 years.

Pope was quoted in 2001 as saying, "Every time I pick that horn up there's always something that I discover I can do differently if I really seek. If you were on planet Earth for, like, 2 billion years, I feel as though there's always something new that you can find to do. There's no end."

Discography

As leader
 Almost Like Me (Moers, 1982)
 The Saxophone Shop (Soul Note, 1985)
 The Ponderer (Soul Note, 1990)
 Out for a Walk (Moers, 1990)
 Epitome (Soul Note, 1993)
 Ninety Six (Enja, 1996)
 Collective Voices (CIMP, 1996)
 Ebioto (Knitting Factory, 1999)
 Changes & Changes (CIMP, 1999)
 Philadelphia Spirit in New York, (CIMP, 2001)
 Nothing Is Wrong (CIMP, 2004)
 Two Dreams (CIMP, 2004)
 Mystery of Prince Lasha (CIMP, 2005)
 Locked & Loaded: Live at the Blue Note (Half Note, 2006)
 To the Roach (CIMP, 2007)
 What Went Before, Vol. 1 (Porter, 2008)
 Plant Life (Porter, 2008)
 The Misled Children Meet Odean Pope (2008)
 Universal Sounds (Porter, 2011)
 Odean's List (In+Out, 2010)
 Odean's Three (In+Out, 2012)
 In This Moment (CIMP, 2016)

As sideman
With Max Roach
 Pictures in a Frame (Soul Note, 1979)
 In the Light (Soul Note, 1982)
 It's Christmas Again (Soul Note, 1984)
 Scott Free (1984)
 Easy Winners (Soul Note, 1985)
 Bright Moments (Soul Note, 1986)
 To the Max! (Enja, 1992)
 Live in Berlin (2010)

With Catalyst
 1972 Perception 
 1974 Unity
 1999 The Funkiest Band You Never Heard
 2010 The Complete Recordings, Vol. 1
 2010 The Complete Recordings, Vol. 2

With others
 1965 Metaphysics: The Lost Atlantic Album, Hasaan Ibn Ali
 1972 Catalyst, Eddie Green
 1986 Music World, Jamaaladeen Tacuma
 1992 Seeking Spirit, Bobby Zankel
 1996 13 Steps on Glass, Sunny Murray
 2001 Philadelphia Spirit in New York, Byard Lancaster
 2002 Stepping Around the Giant, Carl Grubbs
 2006 A Horse of a Different Rhythm, Craig McIver
 2008 Let the Rhythm Take You, Monnette Sudler
 2009 Blueprints of Jazz, Vol. 3, Donald Bailey
 2009 Brownswood Bubblers Four, Gilles Peterson
 2009 Impressions of Coltrane, Khan Jamal
 2012 Matt Covington, Matt Covington

References

External links

American jazz saxophonists
American male saxophonists
Musicians from South Carolina
CIMP artists
1938 births
Living people
People with bipolar disorder
Moers Music artists
Pew Fellows in the Arts
People from Ninety Six, South Carolina
21st-century American saxophonists
American male jazz musicians
Catalyst (band) members
21st-century American male musicians